Street dogs (Bulgarian: улични кучета, ˈulichni ˈkucheta) are a notable subpopulation of dogs arising and existing in Bulgaria's capital Sofia since 1990. It overlaps to a large extent the local free-ranging dog population. First publicly available data on street population count showed 11,124 dogs in mid-2007. After a fatal incident of prominent person killed by packs of strays in Sofia in spring 2012, City Hall proclaimed plans to reduce this population by 95 per cent by 2016. Following their massive removal from public spaces, in mid-2018, 3,589 dogs reportedly remained outside.

Other synonyms
The legal term is безстопанствени кучета, bezstoˈpanstveni ˈkucheta, unowned dogs. 

Colloquially, they are also called бездомни кучета, bezˈdomni ˈkucheta, or homeless dogs, or just скитащи кучета, ˈskitashti ˈkucheta, roaming dogs.

Dog population management
Dog control measures performed by municipality, NGOs and local volunteers since 1990s so far are primarily focused on street population. It includes promiscuous practising of stray dog removal and killing, catch-neuter-release, and re-homing. However, all that does not address in any way the core issue with the overpopulation in domestic pets and dog ownership that boomed early 1990s. So in 2005, colonies and packs of unwanted dogs of very different levels of socialisation were commonly seen in any neighbourhood of Sofia.

The authorities' unwillingness to manage this crisis successfully left thousands of strays to die outside, whether of car accidents, poisoning or shooting. For instance, 1,379 carcasses of homeless dogs were collected in 2012 alone, while 3,784 were neutered and released the same year according to Sofia animal control chief. "Six countries (Bosnia-Herzegovina, Bulgaria, Italy, Malta, Serbia and Spain) operatedcatch, neuter, release in a limited number of locations, although the reasons for this were unclear, aswere the problems encountered when adopting this approach," Louisa Tasker of World Society for the Protection of animals resumed in 2007.

Human-dog conflict became persistent. Despite that many people have been attacked by stray dogs, those who kill dogs may face from 3 up to 5 years imprisonment, though it is not known if the law is just nominal and may have been even unenforced.

Dog Attacks 
In January 2005, Elena Cholova (31) was overthrown and bitten by pack of dogs in Studentski Grad neighbourhood. She latter sued Sofia Municipality.

An attack by stray dogs in the Sofia Zoo in 2010 resulted in the death of eight mouflons, and four fallow deers and a doe.

In 2014, the districts of Studentski grad, Ovcha kupel,  and Pancharevo had the highest rate of dog attacks.

Botyo Tachkov's death
Botyo Tachkov (87), considered by many in Bulgaria to be a world's celebrity, was attacked and severely injured by a pack of dogs in Malinova dolina neighbourhood late March 2012. About 20 dogs bit his left foot and his eyes, making him blind according to the doctors. Though he survived the incident, he died in the hospital 10 days later after intensive care and an unsuccessful surgery. In the past, Tachkov was a Wall Street broker and university professor in Columbia University and Germany. He is author of a book entitled "Пари на борсата" ("Мoney on the stock exchange"), released 1992 in Bulgaria. There were pointed out high positions in the US Department of State, the United Nations, the World Bank and a Wall Street investment bank taken by him; and Eleonore Roosevelt and Fulbright awards as well. Just before his death, Tachkov was a teacher at the American College of Sofia.

Second human killing in three months
In June 2012, another elderly man (89) died in the hospital after he was found in Reduta neighbourhood with his legs bitten to the bone.

Animal control services
After the incident in Malinova Dolina, 23 dogs were caught. An investigation has proved 4 of them as aggressive and they were killed. The rest 19 were impounded in the Seslavtsi dog shelter from where they could be adopted. Some Austrians wanted to adopt the dogs involved in the incident. The mayor complained that some adopted dogs are eventually released on the streets by their adopters.

Obscure dog control policies raised some public outrage. Briefly after the deadly cases, Georgi Kadiev, a political rival of the mayor Yordanka Fandakova tried to sue her, but the prosecutor rejected his claim.

Because of the incidents, Mayor declared stray population "the Sofia's top problem." Government suggested a more strict euthanasia program for aggressive animals and construction of emergency shelters to remove other strays from the street. Animal right advocates struck back, accusing authorities of weak control over pet owners who do not register their animals and often abandon them or their litters on the streets, and state that there are corrupt practices when it comes to neutering dogs. 

Mayor Fandakova alarmed late 2012 on many strays from other parts of the country constantly dumped in the capital.

Funding
Sofia, the capital city of poorest European Union member country, started since 2008 to pour over a million of leva in dog management programs.

Record keeping and reporting
Ecoravovesie, the local animal control services entity, reports quite incomplete data on dog intake and disposition. That may be quite confusing and perplexing to the public. Stray population obviously decreased, while officials claimed unrealistic rates of live releases. For example, a total of 26,118 dogs were reported as sterilized and released outside between September 2006 and July 2013. Between 2008 and 2010, the dogs reported as euthanised or died were 2728. Only extremely aggressive dogs, involved in incidents and suffering incurable illness were euthanised is said. So the type of disposition of tens of thousands of dogs remains undisclosed.

Population Figures

In 2011, there was reported a highest concentration of strays around the southern ring of Sofia, where Botyo Tachkov died. In 2014, a highest concentration of street dogs was found in the Romani neighbourhoods, where 1000 dogs were neutered.

In 2014, Sofia with 1.2 million people had reportedly lower ratio of strays per humans in comparison to other cities, e.g. Veliko Tarnovo with 2000 stray dogs per 60,000 people.

Owned dog population
Though main source of stray dogs, there is no reliable data on the local owned dog population number. However, The European Pet Food Industry (FEDIAF) estimated the national one to be 740,000 in 2018 (per 7 million people). From there, and taking into account the urbanisation as a suppressing factor in dog ownership, owned dogs in Sofia might count some 100,000 or 120,000. The registered owned dogs in Sofia were once just 10,683.

Rabies cases
In 2007–2016, the registered cases of rabid animals of any species in Sofia Municipality were 7 out of 158 at national level. A breakdown by species was presented for the national total only as follows: 110 foxes; 19 dogs; 15 cats; 10 jackals; and 4 farm animals.

See also
 Street dogs in Bucharest
 Street dogs in Moscow

References

Sofia